Nova Kinosenter is a cinema located in the city of Trondheim in Norway. It is one of Norway's most modern cinemas, and in September 2004, six new auditoria were added to the existing five. In its current form, Nova can accommodate 1314 people.

Auditoria

* Auditorium number one is called Ullman-salen (the Ullmann auditorium), named after the famous Norwegian actor Liv Johanne Ullmann.

External links
 Trondheim Kino AS—the company that operates Nova

Other sources
 Haugan, Trond E. Byens magiske rom: Historien om Trondheim kino (Tapir Akademisk Forlag, 2008) 

Cinemas in Norway
Buildings and structures in Trondheim
Tourist attractions in Trondheim